Mary Riter Hamilton (1867–1954) was a Canadian artist. In 1919, she painted the battlefields of France and Belgium, recording the aftermath of World War I. 

She has been dubbed "Canada’s First Woman Artist", although this is chronologically false.

Life and work 
Mary Riter was born in Teeswater, Ontario February 11, 1867. Shortly after her birth, the family moved to Clearwater, Manitoba. She retained her ties with Manitoba in her later life.

In 1889, when she was 18, she married Charles W. Hamilton, a merchant, and moved to Port Arthur, Ontario to be with him. The marriage was short as her husband died four years later in 1893. She then began painting china and waterpaint in Winnipeg, Manitoba. She briefly went to study in Toronto, Ontario and eventually moving to Europe studying in Germany, Italy, the Netherlands, Spain and France. 
She studied at the Académie Vitti in Paris.
In 1906, she returned to Winnipeg because of her mother's failing health. In 1911, she had a gallery show in Toronto with 150 paintings. In 1914, she then moved to Victoria, Ontario.

On her return from Europe, Hamilton organized a number of successful exhibitions of her work in  Toronto, Ottawa, Montreal, Winnipeg and Calgary. The start of World War I prevented her from returning to Paris. She spent the years of the war in Victoria, British Columbia supporting herself by selling her work and taking portrait commissions.

During the First World War, Mary Riter Hamilton actively campaigned to return to Europe as a war artist to document Canada’s military contribution. It wasn't until 1919, where H.F. Paton, a Vancouver publisher, began to compile a work entitled 'The Gold Stripe' which collected stories, photographs and memorabilia about the Great War, with proceeds sent to 'The Amputation Club of British Columbia', that commissioned Hamilton to produce paintings of the French battlefields. For three years, she lived in a tin hut, at first with a Canadian army contingent but later with Chinese workers hired to clear the Western Front of the debris of war despite gangs of criminals and deserters. She painted on canvases as various as plywood, paper, canvas and cardboard. The makeshift shelters, poor food and hostile weather left her emotionally and physically drained, never being able to paint with the same intensity again. Between 1919 and 1922, Hamilton painted with whatever materials came to hand, recording the destruction left by the war, the commemorations of those lost and the celebrations of the return to normal life. She painted more than 300 images in the uncomfortable and sometimes dangerous conditions of the former Western Front.  The War Amps would later produce an award-winning documentary called 'No Man's Land', re-telling Mary Riter Hamilton's story.

Exhibitions of the earlier paintings took place in Vancouver and Victoria in 1920. Further exhibitions were held at the Palais Garnier in Paris in 1922; and in Amiens and then in London at Surrey House.

In 1926, she donated 227 of her battlefield works to the Dominion Archives, wanting the works for the "benefit of war veterans, their families and future generations."

She retired, partially blind, to Vancouver, British Columbia in the 1930s, eventually dying there on January 22, 1954. Her body was transported to Port Arthur, Ontario and was buried beside her husband.

Honors 
 Ordre des Palmes Académiques, Officier d'Académie, France, 1922
 Diploma and Gold Medal, International Exposition of Modern Industrial and Decorative Arts, 1925

Legacy 
In 1988, War Amputations of Canada released No Man's Land a documentary short focusing on Mary Riter Hamilton and the collection of her war paintings in the care of Library and Archives Canada.
 Silver Award (Historical Programming) - 1989 Houston International Film & Video Festival (Texas)
 Certificate for Creative Excellence (History) - 1989 U.S. Industrial Film & Video Festival (Illinois)
 Achievement Award - 1989 Society for Technical Communication's Audio/Visual Competition (California
 Honourable Mention - 1989 National Educational Film & Video Festival (California)
 Honourable Mention - 1989 Columbus International Film Festival (Ohio)

References

External links

 Podcast about the life of Mary Riter Hamilton from Library and Archives Canada

Further reading  

1867 births
1954 deaths
20th-century Canadian painters
Artists from Manitoba
Recipients of the Ordre des Palmes Académiques
Canadian women painters
20th-century Canadian women artists
World War I artists